Pouteria rodriguesiana is a species of plant in the family Sapotaceae. It is found in Brazil, French Guiana, and Suriname.

References

rodriguesiana
Near threatened plants
Taxonomy articles created by Polbot
Taxa named by João Murça Pires